Florence de la Courtie-Billat (born 13 November 1935) is a French former tennis player.

Active on tour in the 1950s and 1960s, de la Courtie reached the top of the French rankings during her career. She made the singles round of 16 at the 1961 Wimbledon Championships and was a women's doubles quarter-finalist at the 1962 French Championships (with Françoise Dürr).

References

External links
 
 

1935 births
Living people
French female tennis players